SSLP may refer to:

 Simple sequence length polymorphism (compare RFLP)
 The Slim Shady LP, American singer and rapper Eminem's second studio album (1999)
Southwark Schools' Learning Partnership
 Sit Still, Look Pretty, Daya song